Darius II was king of the Persian Empire from 423 BC to 405 or 404 BC.

Darius II may also refer to:

Darius II of Persis (1st century AD), king of the Kingdom of Persis
Darius II (video game)

See also
Darius (disambiguation)